Mary Brigid "Bridey" Matheney, (born January 18, 1974) is a Republican former member of the Ohio House of Representatives. She was appointed to the position in February 2012, and served until April 16, 2012, when she was replaced by Matt Lynch. Matheney graduated from the University of Dayton with a Bachelor of Arts in Political Science in 1996. She later graduated Juris Doctor, cum laude, from the Cleveland–Marshall College of Law in 1999. Matheney currently serves as an assistant prosecutor in the Geauga County Prosecutor’s Office for Geauga County, Ohio.

References

Living people
1974 births
Republican Party members of the Ohio House of Representatives
21st-century American politicians
People from Bainbridge, Geauga County, Ohio
Women in Ohio politics
University of Dayton alumni
Cleveland–Marshall College of Law alumni
People from Mayfield Heights, Ohio
21st-century American women politicians